Jolanta Kvašytė (born 29 May 1956 in Vilnius) is a Lithuanian ceramic artist.

In 1982, she graduated from the Lithuanian Institute of Fine Arts. In 1982–1984, she worked in a factory "Jiesia" Kybartu shop, in 1985-1988 Restoration Trust in Vilnius. In 2003, she was resident artist at the University of Akron.
She showed at the Klaipėda Baroti gallery,
and The Ceramics Museum, Kaunas.

Works
Which mostly Thematic compositions ("Stations of the Cross" 1992, "City" in 1995, "Bethlehem" in 1996, "the ship" in 1997), sculptor to the small plastic ("Autumn bugs" in 1990 " St. John's Night "1991," Love Cats "in 1994," Adam and Eve "in 2004, Saba Queen" in 2006). Creator works in interior (plate "glass" in 1993, "Zodiac," "mechanical dolls", both in 1994–1995, all "glass" in the hotel and restaurant), garden pottery ("Pyramid" in the square in Panevezys, 1998), servizi ("pagoda" in 1991), vases (Turkish bathing "in 1999). Recently created monumentalesnių more generalized mosaic sculpture compositions: "Ophelia" (2000), "New York Code" (2004), "The Kiss" (2006).

Work is used and delicately combined clay, porcelain, black pottery and various other materials (Biseris, stones, feathers). Free to interpret the religious and secular themes, distinct expression of Tipaza, expression, story telling, dramatic play, theatricality, grotesque, irony, šaržavimo moments, rich in metaphors, allegories. Works decorative, rich colors, finely ornamented.

Since 1983, she participated in exhibitions, in international Pottery and Porcelain symposia in Lithuania and abroad (in Latvia, Poland, Czech Republic, Great Britain, the USA).

Solo shows
 Vilnius – 1990–1995, 1997, 1998, 2000, 2003, 2005, 2006
 Klaipėda – 1992
 Oslas – 1991, 1992
 Akronas – 2003
 Helsinkis – 2004

See also
List of Lithuanian painters

References

External links
"Jolanta Kvašytė", Lithuanian Wikipedia
Universal Lithuanian Encyclopedia

Lithuanian painters
1956 births
Living people
Artists from Vilnius
20th-century Lithuanian women artists
21st-century Lithuanian women artists